The Type 051 destroyer (NATO/OSD Luda-class destroyer) was a class of guided missile destroyers based on the hull of the Soviet  deployed by China. It was the first guided missile destroyer fielded by the People's Liberation Army Navy (PLAN), and the first designed and built in China. 17 were built from 1970 to 1990; it was not until the 21st century that China would again build a class in such large numbers.

NATO/OSD broadly grouped variants from refits and newer construction under the Luda I, Luda II, Luda III, and Luda IV classes.

History
Work resumed in 1965 with nine ships being ordered. Construction started in 1968, with trials beginning in 1971. The ships nominally entered service in the early 1970s, but few were fully operational before 1985; workmanship was poor due to the Cultural Revolution.

Construction of the second batch began in 1977, with the last commissioning in 1991. The second batch may have been ordered due to the Cultural Revolution disrupting development of a successor class. These ships may be designated  Type 051D.

The PLAN initiated an abortive modernization program for the first batch in 1982. The ships would be reconstructed with British weapons and sensors acquired from British Aerospace. The Falklands War made the prospective upgrades less impressive and cost effective, and the project was cancelled in 1984. A 1986 upgrade project using American power plants, weapons, sensors, and computers was cancelled because of the 1989 Tiananmen Square protests.

Jinan, the first of class, became a trials ship in 1987; a helicopter hangar and flight deck replaced the rear armament. This configuration was referred to as Luda II.

The last two ships, Zhanjiang and Zhuhai, were upgraded with foreign – mainly French – systems, possibly being designated as Type 051G, and referred to as Luda III. They became test beds and many of the systems were later employed on the Type 052 and Type 051B destroyers. Both ships were decommissioned on 3 September 2020, being the last of their class to retire from service.

Twelve ships of the class – Jinan, Yinchuan, Nanjing, Nanchang, Chongqing, Xining, Zhanijiang,  Zhuhai, Hefei, Zunyi, Dalian, and Xi'an – have been preserved as museum ships.

Variants

Type 051
The Type 051 was the initial design using Soviet or Soviet-derived systems.

The anti-ship missiles were P-15 Termit derivatives (HY-1, and possibly later HY-2) in two triple-launchers. Guns were two twin  gun mounts (SM-2-1 derivatives), and four twin  anti-aircraft guns.

Anti-submarine equipment were Soviet hull-mounted Pegas 2 and Tamir-2 sonars, depth charges, and FQF-2500 rocket launchers (Soviet RBU-1200 derivatives).

The Type 051 was part of the Luda I class.

Type 051D

The Type 051D was from the second batch. It had changes to electronics and was equipped for underway replenishment.

The Type 051D was part of the Luda I class.

Type 051DT

The Type 051DT was a modernized Type 051D. Kaifeng and Dalian were modernized to somewhat different designs.

Kaifeng initially received the Thomson-CSF Tavitac combat data system, the Type 393 surface search radar, and HQ-7 (Crotale derivative) surface-to-air missiles (SAM); the missiles replaced "X" turret. In 1999, YJ-8 missiles replaced the HY-series, and electronic warfare systems were upgraded.

Dalian received a similar modernization as Kaifeng. A notable difference was Dalian used the ZKJ-1 combat data system, which was also used on the Type 051Z.

They were later equipped with YJ-83 anti-ship missiles.

The Type 051DT was part of the Luda III class, and later the Luda IV class.

Type 051Z
The Type 051Z was a command variant with the ZKJ-1 combat data system. Anti-aircraft warfare capabilities were improved by replacing the 37 mm guns with Soviet  guns, and fitting modern Type 381A 3-D radar.

One Type 051D, Hefei, was converted to a Type 051Z.

The Type 051Z was part of the Luda I class.

Luda II

The Luda II was a helicopter destroyer. The gun turrets aft of the aft missile launcher were replaced by a hangar and flight deck for two Harbin Z-9C helicopters.

One Type 051, Jinan, was converted into a Luda II in 1987 for trials.

Type 051G
The Type 051G was an improved variant that the last two ships, Zhanjiang and Zhuhai, were completed to. They were equipped with Type 354 3-D air and surface search radar. Four twin YJ-8 launchers replaced the HY-1/HY-2 launchers. The Soviet sonar was replaced by French DUBV-23 search sonar and DUBV-43 variable depth sonar (VDS).

Zhuhai was modified in 1999. The Soviet 130 mm guns were replaced by Type 79A  guns, derived from French Creusot-Loire Compact, with automated reloaders. An HQ-7 SAM launcher replaced the "X" turret, as on the Type 051DT. Zhuhai was similarly modified.

Zhanjiang and Zhuhai were equipped with the ZKG-4A and ZKG-4B combat data systems respectively.

The Type 051G was also the first Chinese ship to deploy the YU-7 lightweight torpedo, and the Italian  anti-aircraft gun.

The Type 051G was part of the Luda III class, and later the Luda IV class.

Ships of class

The number is the order of completion.

References

Bibliography

 
 
 
 
 
 

Destroyer classes